Gustave Klein (28 November 1901 – 2 January 1962) was a French freestyle swimmer who competed at the 1924 and 1928 Summer Olympics. In 1924 he did not finish his 1500 m race, and in 1928 he failed to reach the finals of the 100 m  and 4 × 200 m relay events.

References

1901 births
1962 deaths
French male freestyle swimmers
Swimmers at the 1924 Summer Olympics
Swimmers at the 1928 Summer Olympics
Olympic swimmers of France
People from Schiltigheim
Sportspeople from Bas-Rhin
20th-century French people